Hibbertia pancerea is a species of flowering plant in the family Dilleniaceae and is endemic to Kakadu National Park. It is a spreading shrub foliage densely covered with shield-like scales, that has elliptic leaves and yellow flowers arranged singly in leaf axils with 26 to 30 stamens arranged in bundles around two carpels.

Description
Flowering has been observed in February and March.

Taxonomy
Hibbertia pancerea was first formally described in 2010 by Hellmut R. Toelken in the Journal of the Adelaide Botanic Gardens from specimens collected by David L. Jones in 1984 at Lightning Dreaming in Kakadu National Park. The specific epithet (pancerea) means "with medieval mail of armour", referring to the large scales covering the plant.

Distribution and habitat
This hibbertia grows in shrubland and forest, amongst sandstone rocks and occurs on the top of the escarpment of the northern Arnhem Land plateau in Kakadu National Park.

Conservation status
Hibbertia pancerea is classified as "vulnerable" under the Territory Parks and Wildlife Conservation Act 1976.

See also
List of Hibbertia species

References

pancerea
Flora of the Northern Territory
Plants described in 2010
Taxa named by Hellmut R. Toelken